"Kristofferson" is a song written by Anthony Smith and Reed Nielsen, and recorded by American country music singer Tim McGraw.  It was released in March 2008 as the fifth single from his album Let It Go.  The song peaked at number 16 on the country singles charts.

Content
A mid-tempo ballad accompanied by piano and fiddle, "Kristofferson" centralizes on a character (the narrator) who has just returned home only to discover that his significant other has departed, leaving only a note which fills up half a sheet of paper. Upon seeing the note, the narrator takes a pencil and begins to write down his feelings (in lyrical form) in the remaining space, using his composition as an allusion to songwriter Kris Kristofferson.

Critical reception
Brady Vercher of Engine 145 gave the song a thumbs-down review. He said that the song seemed like an attempt to capitalize on Kristofferson's fame, and did not expand on the title beyond name-checking. However, Vercher said that the production was pleasant and that McGraw sang the song well.

Chart performance
The song debuted at number 53 on the Hot Country Songs chart dated March 15, 2008.

References

Songs about musicians
Songs about parting
2008 singles
2007 songs
Tim McGraw songs
Songs written by Anthony Smith (singer)
Song recordings produced by Byron Gallimore
Song recordings produced by Tim McGraw
Curb Records singles
Country ballads
Songs written by Reed Nielsen